Merima Denboba (born 21 August 1974 in Arsi) is an Ethiopian former long-distance runner, who specialized in the 5000 metres and cross-country running.

Denboba won the 2003 Oeiras International Cross Country, beating two-time champion Leah Malot in the process. She also won the Cross Internacional de Itálica that year, and returned for a second victory in 2004. Medina now coaches the track and field team of Seattle Preparatory School

International competitions

Personal bests
1500 metres - 4:14.60 min (1994)
3000 metres - 8:44.21 min (1999)
5000 metres - 15:06.08 min (2001)
10,000 metres - 31:32.63 min (1999)
Half marathon - 1:11:37 hrs (2005)
Marathon - 2:32:54 hrs (2007)

References

External links

1974 births
Living people
Ethiopian female long-distance runners
Ethiopian female marathon runners
Athletes (track and field) at the 1996 Summer Olympics
Olympic athletes of Ethiopia
World Athletics Championships athletes for Ethiopia
20th-century Ethiopian women
21st-century Ethiopian women